Eudryoctenes africanus is a species of beetle in the family Cerambycidae. It was described by Karl Jordan in 1903.

Subspecies
 Eudryoctenes africanus africanus (Jordan, 1903)
 Eudryoctenes africanus orientalis Breuning, 1958
 Eudryoctenes africanus togonicus (Hintz, 1919)

References

Polyrhaphidini
Beetles described in 1903